The 2004–05 Moldovan National Division was the 14th season of top-tier football in Moldova.

Overview
It was contested by 8 teams and Sheriff Tiraspol won the championship.

League standings

Results

First and second round

Third and fourth round

Relegation/promotion play-off

Top goalscorers

References
Moldova - List of final tables (RSSSF)
 Divizia Națională 2004-05 pe soccerway
 Statistica Generala Divizia Națională 2004-2005 - www.divizianationala.com
 Arhiva campionatelor Moldovei - FMF.md
 Divizia Națională 2004-2005 pe betexplorer

Moldovan Super Liga seasons
1
Moldova